Rory Galligan (1973–2012) was a rally car driver from Oldcastle, Ireland who retired from the sport in 2006 because of a diagnosis of motor neuron disease, dying on 21 May 2012.

He began to race in 1993 but was most successful in the late 1990s in a Peugeot 205, moving to the Mitsubushi works team in 2005.

After retiring, Galligan taught road safety to new drivers.

References

External links
 Rory Galligan's crash at the British Rally Championship's Ulster Rally

Irish rally drivers
Irish racing drivers
Motorsport in Ireland
Irish motorsport people
1987 births
2012 deaths